A quasi-judicial body is non-judicial body which can interpret            law. It is an entity such as an arbitration panel or tribunal board, that can be a public administrative agency but also a contract- or private law entity, which has been given powers and procedures resembling those of a court of law or judge, and which is obliged to objectively determine facts and draw conclusions from them so as to provide the basis of an official action. Such actions are able to remedy a situation or impose legal penalties, and they may affect the legal rights, duties or privileges of specific parties.

Powers

Such bodies usually have powers of adjudication in such matters as:
 breach of discipline
 conduct rules
 trust in the matters of money or otherwise

Their powers are usually limited to a very specific area of expertise and authority, such as land use and zoning, financial markets, employment law, public standards, and/or a specific set of regulations of an agency.

The decisions of such a body are often made after a quasi-judicial proceeding which may resemble a court.

Differences from judicial bodies
There are some key differences between judicial and quasi-judicial bodies, in that:
 Judicial decisions are bound by precedent in common law, whereas quasi-judicial decisions usually are not so bound;
 In the absence of precedent in common law, judicial decisions may create new law, whereas quasi-judicial decisions must be based on conclusions of existing law;
 Quasi-judicial bodies need not always follow strict judicial rules of evidence and procedure; 
 Quasi-judicial bodies must hold formal hearings only if mandated to do so under their governing laws, regulations or agreements;
 Quasi-judicial bodies, unlike courts, may be a party in a matter and issue a decision thereon at the same time, depending on the specifically governing rules.

Decisions
In general, decisions of a quasi-judicial body require findings of facts to reach conclusions of law that justify the decision. They usually depend on a pre-determined set of guidelines or criteria to assess the nature and gravity of the permission or relief sought, or of the offense committed. Decisions of a quasi-judicial body are often legally enforceable under the laws of a jurisdiction; they can be challenged in a court of law, which is the final decisive authority.

List of quasi-judicial bodies
The following is a partial list of quasi-judicial bodies:

Canada
 Canadian International Trade Tribunal
 Canadian Transportation Agency
 Ontarian committees of adjustment
 Ontario Municipal Board
 Trademarks Opposition Board
 Canadian Nuclear Safety Commission

India
Some non-constitutional bodies that are quasi-judicial in nature:
 National Company Law Tribunal (NCLT)
 Income Tax Appellate Tribunal (ITAT)
 Assessing authorities under the Income Tax Laws
 National Human Rights Commission
 National Consumer Disputes Redressal Commission
 Competition Commission of India
 Appellate Tribunal for Electricity
 Railway Claims Tribunal
 Intellectual Property Appellate Tribunal
 Banking Ombudsman
 National Green Tribunal
 Central Information Commission
 Securities and Exchange Board of India (SEBI)
 Reserve Bank of India (RBI)
 Employees Provident Fund Organization

United Kingdom
 Parades Commission
 Planning Committee
 Sheriffs Principal in Scotland
 Financial Services Authority

United States
 United States Merit Systems Protection Board 
 Commercial Fisheries Entry Commission
 Californian planning commissions
 California Coastal Commission
 Federal Aviation Administration
 US Patent & Trademark Office including the Board of Patent Appeals and Interferences
 Local Zoning Board of Appeals
 National Labor Relations Board
 Equal Employment Opportunity Commission
 Federal Election Commission
 Federal Trade Commission
 International Trade Commission

Other
 Parole Board
 Commission of Inquiry
 Human Rights Committee
 Court of Arbitration for Sport
 Philippines Commission on Elections
 National Privacy Commission (Philippines)
 European Patent Office
 National Labor Relations Commission
 New Zealand's Broadcasting Standards Authority
 Botswana Communications Regulatory Authority
Chief District Officer of Nepal
 Federal Judicial Administration Council (Ethiopia) 
 African Commission on Human and Peoples' Rights
 World Trade Organization Dispute Settlement

Further reading
 Mashaw, Jerry L., Richard A. Merrill, and Peter M. Shane. 1992. Administrative Law: The American Public Law System; Cases and Materials. 3d ed. St. Paul, Minn.: West.

References

 
Courts by type